White Eagle is the seventeenth major release and twelfth studio album by Tangerine Dream. It reached No. 57 in the UK album chart in a 5-week run.

The title track was remixed and went on to become the theme music for a German TV series Tatort (Crime Scene) with a German title "Das Mädchen auf der Treppe".

Track listing

Personnel
 Edgar Froese
 Christopher Franke
 Johannes Schmoelling

References

1982 albums
Tangerine Dream albums
Virgin Records albums